The sixth edition of Dancing Stars was broadcast from March 11 to May 27, 2011 on ORF1 and was presented by Mirjam Weichselbraun and Klaus Eberhartinger.

Couples

Scoring chart

Red numbers indicate the lowest score for each week.
Green numbers indicate the highest score for each week.
 indicates the couple eliminated that week.
 indicates the returning couple that finished in the bottom two.
 indicates the returning couple that was the last to be called safe.
 indicates the winning couple.
 indicates the runner-up couple.
 indicates the third-place couple.

Highest and lowest scoring performances of the series 
The best and worst performances in each dance according to the judges' marks are as follows:

Average chart

Average Dance chart

Dance order

Week 1: "Aus für James Cottriall" 
Individual judges scores in charts below (given in parentheses) are listed in this order from left to right: Thomas Schäfer-Elmayer, Nicole Burns-Hansen, Marika Lichter and Hannes Nedbal.

Running order

Week 2: "Aus für Christine Kaufmann" 
Individual judges' scores in charts below (given in parentheses) are listed in this order from left to right: Thomas Schäfer-Elmayer, Nicole Burns-Hansen, Karina Sarkissova and Hannes Nedbal.

Running order

Week 3: "Aus für Markus Wolfahrt" 
Individual judges scores in charts below (given in parentheses) are listed in this order from left to right: Thomas Schäfer-Elmayer, Nicole Burns-Hansen, Harald Serafin and Hannes Nedbal.

Running order

Week 4: "Aus für Reinhard Nowak" 
Individual judges scores in charts below (given in parentheses) are listed in this order from left to right: Thomas Schäfer-Elmayer, Nicole Burns-Hansen, Claudia Reiterer and Hannes Nedbal.

Running order

Week 5: "Aus für Uwe Kröger" 
Individual judges scores in charts below (given in parentheses) are listed in this order from left to right: Thomas Schäfer-Elmayer, Nicole Burns-Hansen, Sonya Kraus and Hannes Nedbal.

Running order

Week 6: "Aus für Dieter Chmelar" 
Individual judges scores in charts below (given in parentheses) are listed in this order from left to right: Thomas Schäfer-Elmayer, Nicole Burns-Hansen, Lotte Tobisch and Hannes Nedbal.

Running order

Week 7: "Aus für Cathy Zimmermann" 
Individual judges scores in charts below (given in parentheses) are listed in this order from left to right: Thomas Schäfer-Elmayer, Nicole Burns-Hansen, Christoph Wagner-Trenkwitz and Hannes Nedbal.

Running order

Week 8: "Aus für Mirna Jukić" 
Individual judges scores in charts below (given in parentheses) are listed in this order from left to right: Thomas Schäfer-Elmayer, Nicole Burns-Hansen, Wayne Carpendale and Hannes Nedbal.

Running order

Week 9: "Aus für Alfons Haider" 
Individual judges scores in charts below (given in parentheses) are listed in this order from left to right: Thomas Schäfer-Elmayer, Nicole Burns-Hansen, Peter Kraus and Hannes Nedbal.

Running order

Week 10: "Das Finale" 
Individual judges scores in charts below (given in parentheses) are listed in this order from left to right: Thomas Schäfer-Elmayer, Nicole Burns-Hansen, Karina Sarkissova and Hannes Nedbal.

Running order

Call-out order
The table below lists the order in which the contestants' fates were revealed. The order of the safe couples doesn't reflect the viewer voting results.

 This couple came in first place with the judges.
 This couple came in last place with the judges.
 This couple came in last place with the judges and was eliminated.
 This couple was eliminated.
 This couple won the competition.
 This couple came in second in the competition.

Dance chart

 Highest scoring dance
 Lowest scoring dance

References
Official website of Dancing Stars

Season 06
2011 Austrian television seasons